Universal Kids is an American children's television channel owned by the NBCUniversal Television and Streaming unit of Comcast's NBCUniversal.

The channel launched on September 26, 2005, as PBS Kids Sprout, a preschool-oriented channel jointly operated by PBS, Comcast, Sesame Workshop, and HIT Entertainment, as an offshoot of the PBS Kids brand. After the acquisition of NBC Universal by Comcast in 2011, the company began to buy out the remaining owners' shares in the network. NBCUniversal became the sole owner of the network in 2013, after which it was renamed Sprout. Under NBCUniversal ownership, the channel increased its investments into original programming.

In 2017, the network relaunched as Universal Kids, adding an evening and primetime lineup targeting a wider youth audience—including DreamWorks Animation content, non-scripted programming (including game shows, and youth spin-offs of reality series from its NBCUniversal sister networks, such as American Ninja Warrior and Top Chef), and acquired teen dramas. The channel continues to devote its daytime lineup to preschool programming.

Amid declines in viewership in comparison to Sprout, Universal Kids ended its development of new original programming in 2019, with the channel now relying primarily on acquisitions and DreamWorks Animation content (drawn primarily from the series they had originally produced for Netflix), and some of its remaining first-run programming moving to NBCUniversal's streaming service Peacock instead.

, the channel is available to about 56.240 million households in the United States.

History

As (PBS Kids) Sprout (2005–2017)

Development and launch 

On October 20, 2004, PBS announced that it had entered into a partnership with cable provider Comcast and production companies HIT Entertainment and Sesame Workshop to launch a 24-hour cable network aimed at preschool children. On April 4, 2005, Comcast announced that the network would be known as PBS Kids Sprout—a spin-off from PBS's children's programming brand PBS Kids. The service would soft launch as a branded video on-demand (VOD) service. PBS Kids Sprout launched its 24-hour cable channel on September 26, 2005, with a reach of around 16 million viewers across the Comcast and Insight cable systems.

The multi-platform approach was designed to appeal to different viewing habits; the Sprout channel featured dayparted programming blocks, with hosted segments such as activities, features, and promotions for supplemental content on Sprout's website. To increase the variety of its schedule, Sprout did not repackage short-form series into half-hour episodes with interstitial segments, as had usually been the case for series imported for U.S. broadcast. The channel only carried advertising between programs, which were aimed towards parents and caregivers.

A high-definition simulcast launched in September 2010.

Acquisition by Comcast/NBCUniversal 
Comcast acquired a 51% majority stake in NBC Universal from General Electric in January 2011, and would assume full ownership of the company in 2013. As a result, Comcast's interest in Sprout was turned over to the company. Apax Partners sold HIT Entertainment to Mattel on October 24, 2011; the sale did not include HIT's stake in Sprout, which was retained by Apax. On July 7, 2012, Sprout began to produce educational programming blocks for NBC and Telemundo, branded as "NBC Kids" and "MiTelemundo" respectively. The blocks both replaced Qubo (a previous joint venture between NBCUniversal, Ion Media, Corus Entertainment, Scholastic, and Classic Media), which had been airing on NBC and Telemundo since September 2006.

In December 2012, Sesame Workshop sold its interest in Sprout to Comcast. On March 19, 2013, Comcast acquired the remaining 49% of NBCUniversal it did not already own, and concurrently acquired Apax's stake in Sprout. Comcast then acquired PBS's share in Sprout on November 13, 2013, giving it full ownership. As a result, the network's operations were brought under the NBCUniversal Cable Entertainment Group, and the "PBS Kids" branding was removed (thus officially shortening its name to "Sprout"). Its operations were later moved from Philadelphia to NBCUniversal's facilities in New York City.

Under NBCUniversal ownership, Sprout began to increase its investments in original programming to better compete with Disney Junior and Nick Jr., with a goal to double its original series output to at least 30% of its schedule by the end of 2015, and displace older and non-exclusive library content in favor of original series and acquisitions exclusive to the channel. Sprout programs such as The Chica Show also earned increased visibility airing on NBC as part of the NBC Kids block.

On September 26, 2015, Sprout underwent a brand refresh to mark the tenth anniversary of its launch, with new on-air imaging inspired by modern technology and mobile devices, a new tiny house-inspired studio at 30 Rockefeller Plaza for its hosted morning block The Sunny Side Up Show, as well as the premiere of Nina's World—an original animated series spun off from its evening block The Good Night Show. Actress Alyssa Milano began to make appearances in interstitial segments as Sprout's "Mom-bassador", with a particular focus on the channel's public service campaign "Kindness Counts".

The network's head Sandy Wax stated that Sprout also planned to experiment with more half-hour programs, and commission programming with more "complex stories" that can appeal better to older preschool audiences.

As Universal Kids (2017–present) 

In August 2016, NBCUniversal acquired DreamWorks Animation. Deirdre Brennan, formerly of Canadian media company Corus Entertainment, was named the new president of Sprout in January 2017, replacing the outgoing Sandy Wax.

On May 1, 2017, NBCUniversal announced that it would be relaunching Sprout on September 9, 2017, as Universal Kids; the relaunched network aimed to be "an umbrella brand for [NBCUniversal's] family offerings", and would include primetime programming targeting a wider youth and pre-teen audience, while still carrying preschool programming as a block under the Sprout branding from 3 a.m. to 6 p.m. ET daily. Brennan explained that Sprout needed to "grow up with the rest of the family", and that Universal Kids would "[offer] something to 2 to 12 year olds that has a slightly different purpose—widening their eyes, opening their minds and celebrating many aspects of being a kid."

The network would launch with a slate of original non-scripted series, including Bear Grylls: Survival School and Top Chef Junior. NBCUniversal intended to make "significant" investments in original content for Universal Kids over the next three years, including original scripted programming. The launch lineup included a large number of international acquisitions, particularly from the U.K., Australia, and Canada (such as The Next Step and Nowhere Boys); Brennan acknowledged that since youth audiences had become "globally aware", the network wanted to showcase foreign series that had not yet aired in the United States. Universal Kids would also feature programing produced by Canadian studio DHX Media for Family Channel and its sister networks, as well as co-produce series with the company (such as the sitcom Bajillionaires); DHX had recently entered into a programming agreement with DreamWorks Animation for its networks.

DreamWorks would be leveraged by Universal Kids to bolster its programming, with linear television premieres of DreamWorks' Netflix series such as All Hail King Julien and Dragons: Riders of Berk as part of its launch lineup. Industry observers felt that the integration of DreamWorks IP with Universal Kids would help NBCUniversal establish a viable multi-platform competitor to other major children's networks. The network planned to continue investing in preschool programming for the Sprout block; Brennan stated of Sprout that "the greatest thing is, there is nothing to fix there. Sprout is a beautiful brand. If anything, we want to invest more in original production. There is more we can explore there."

Universal Kids saw a significant decrease in viewership in comparison to its previous incarnation as Sprout, with IndieWire reporting a 30% decline in 2017, followed by a 73% drop in 2018. Brennan was replaced by Frances Berwick as network president in February 2019. In April of that year, Universal Kids unveiled a new logo and branding designed by the design agency Kill 2 Birds. On June 19, it was reported that Universal Kids had ceased the development of original programming, and had laid off its development staff or transferred them to other NBCUniversal properties. Thereafter, the channel would rely primarily on DreamWorks content, acquisitions, and its remaining slate of original programming. Some Universal Kids original series, such as American Ninja Warrior Junior and Where's Waldo?, moved to NBCUniversal's new streaming service Peacock.

Based on numbers from Nielsen, Variety ranked Universal Kids as the 132nd most-watched broadcast or cable network in the United States in 2021, ranking ahead of only Discovery Familia and BabyFirst in terms of children's channels on the list. It fell further to 139th place in 2022.

Programming 

Currently, the network's most prominent scheduling pattern is marathon 'best-of volume' blocks of one program featuring individual segments aired continuously for 1–3 hours rather than a traditional block of consecutive episodes, emulating the model of the official YouTube channels for prevailing children's series, which either feature a continuous live stream of the series, or an uploaded video several hours in length containing multiple episodes. Traditional marathons of episodes are also scheduled. The scheduling model began in the summer of 2020.

Previously, original programs produced for the network included the Top Chef spin-off Top Chef Junior, the game shows Beat the Clock and The Noise, the bedroom redecoration show Get Out of My Room, and American Ninja Warrior Junior. The channel also airs several series produced by DreamWorks Animation (some of which were originally produced for the streaming service Netflix) and has acquired and co-produced programs with international partners. In 2021, the network acquired exclusive television rights to carry content from the popular YouTube channel Cocomelon.

Preschool programming 
Prior to the Universal Kids launch, Sprout continued to premiere new series such as Kody Kapow, joining a slate that was included Dot, Nina's World, and DreamWorks-produced Noddy, Toyland Detective. New acquisitions such as Masha and the Bear would premiere on the Sprout block alongside the relaunch.

On August 14, 2017, Sprout replaced its long-running morning block Sunny Side Up with Sprout House (renamed Snug's House in 2018), which is presented by Carly Ciarrocchi and the new character Snug, a talking dog portrayed by puppeteer Chris Palmieri, through 90-second segments throughout the block. The program was designed to be more flexible to produce than its predecessor, with a different "tiny house" set with additional areas and camera options. Unlike Sunny Side Up, the segments are pre-recorded instead of broadcast live; supervising producer Vinny Steves felt that the live format was too "limiting", and explained that the new format was also designed to enable the segments to be distributed on digital platforms such as social media. With the launch of Sprout House, the network began to downplay its longtime mascot, Chica, although she was still featured in certain segments (such as Chica at School) until 2020, when it along with the Sprout House / Snug's House segments were removed from Universal Kids' lineup. However, the channel did briefly air reruns of The Chica Show (a former Sprout original show in which Chica starred in), on May 20, 2019, along with Moon and Me and Mofy, but all of these series stopped airing in that same year and 2021 respectively. However, the former aforementioned show reaired on the network on December 24th and 25th, 2022, until it stopped airing on the channel once again, thus putting an end to the network's longtime chicken mascot altogether, and also removing the last vestige of Sprout.

International 

As of September 2018, Universal Kids is available to about 56.240 million households in the United States. Universal Kids operates two feeds nationally, one for the east coast and a times delay one for the west coast. DreamWorks Channel serves as the this network's worldwide equivalent and Sky Kids for the United Kingdom through Comcast's Sky division.

See also
 Peacock, where some Universal Kids content is hosted.
 DreamWorksTV

References

External links 
 

PBS Kids Sprout
Preschool education television networks
2005 establishments in New York City
NBCUniversal networks
English-language television stations in the United States
Children's television networks in the United States
Television channels and stations established in 2005
HIT Entertainment
Television stations in New York City